All Hail King Julien is an American computer-animated 3D streaming television series. It stars King Julien, Maurice, and Mort from the DreamWorks Animation animated film Madagascar franchise and takes place in Madagascar before the events of the first film, making it a prequel. It is the second DreamWorks Animation show to be based on the Madagascar franchise.

The series debuted on December 19, 2014, on Netflix when the first five 22-minute episodes were released. Season 2 was released on October 16, 2015. Season 3 was released on June 17, 2016, Season 4 was released on November 11, 2016, while next season, subtitled Exiled, was released on May 12, 2017. The fifth and final season was released on December 1, 2017. The series is currently showing reruns on Universal Kids in the United States and ABC Me in Australia.

Premise
When King Julien XII (also known as Uncle King Julien), a very strict and cowardly ring-tailed lemur, is foretold to be eaten by fossa (spelled and pronounced as "foosa"), he abdicates his throne in favor of his nephew, who becomes King Julien XIII, a fun, notorious party animal, who now has an entire kingdom of lemurs to lead on his own. While Uncle King Julien is gone, the new King Julien gets into various troubles in the company of his adviser Maurice, his head of security Clover the crowned lemur, and his biggest fan Mort. All the while, his devious uncle returns and tries to get rid of his nephew to reclaim the throne. Aside from Uncle King Julien and the fossa, Julien deals with other threats like the mad fanaloka Karl and Clover's twin sister Crimson.

At the end of the fourth season, King Julien is dethroned and forced into exile by King Koto and his army but successfully defeats Koto and regains his kingdom in the next season, subtitled Exiled. The fifth and final season takes place after Koto's demise; villains such as Karl and Uncle King Julien decide to give up their evil ways and start a new life. This all leads up to the arrival of Alex on Madagascar (setting the stage of the first film) just as Clover leaves with her husband, Sage Moondancer, on their honeymoon.

Episodes

Short films

All Hail King Julien: New Year's Eve Countdown (2017)
All Hail King Julien: New Year's Eve Countdown is a three-minute computer-animated film about celebrating New Year on Madagascar.

All Hail King Julien: Happy Birthday to You (2017)
All Hail King Julien: Happy Birthday to You is a one-minute computer-animated special, which could be used for the birthday of Julien's fan.

Cast

 Danny Jacobs as:
King Julien XIII, a Ring-tailed lemur and the king of the lemurs.
Pancho, a crowned lemur.
 Andy Richter as:
 Mort, a small Goodman's mouse lemur who loves and constantly annoys King Julien.
 Ted, a nervous golden bamboo lemur.
 Kevin Michael Richardson as Maurice, an Aye-aye and Julien's Royal advisor.
 India de Beaufort as:
 Clover, a Crowned lemur who is Julien's bodyguard and Captain of the Ring Tail Guard who later married Sage Moondancer and became Queen of the mountain lemurs.
 Crimson, a Crowned lemur who's Clover's sister who used to work for Uncle King Julien after King Julien XIII dumped her on their wedding day. She later betrayed Uncle King Julien to help her sister stop Julien's uncle from having both Clover and Julien killed by Vigman Wilderbeast. In the series finale, Crimson and Clover made amends after Crimson admitted that she was jealous of her because, despite being her parents' favorite, Clover was the one they were most proud of.
 Henry Winkler as King Julien XII, the former lemur king and King Julien XIII's maternal uncle who constantly tries to assassinate his nephew.
 Dwight Schultz as Karl, a fanaloka who also tried to kill Julien.
 David Krumholtz as Timo, a tenrec who invents things for King Julien.
 Betsy Sodaro as Xixi, a toucan who loves attention.
 Sarah Thyre as Dorothy, a mongoose lemur and Ted's wife.
 Debra Wilson as: 
 Masikura, a psychic chameleon.
 Mary Ann, a fossa who dated Horst.
 Grey DeLisle as Pam Simonsworthington, a ring-tailed mongoose.
 David Koechner as Rob McTodd, a Coquerel's sifaka and King Julien's old friend.
 Kether Donohue as Brosalind, an aye-aye and Maurice's sister.
 Jeff Bennett as:
 Sage Moondancer, a dull indri.
 Hector, a black and white ruffed lemur who hates everybody and everything.
 Horst, a blue-eyed black lemur who used to date Mary Ann.
 Dr. S, a king cobra and mad scientist/unlicensed doctor who practices “OUT OF A CAVE!”.

Production
The series was announced in March 2014 as part of an agreement between Netflix and DreamWorks Animation, under which the studio will develop more than 300 hours of exclusive programming for the service. The series is based on the characters from Madagascar, but is a prequel, set prior to the events of the film series. Danny Jacobs, Andy Richter and Kevin Michael Richardson reprised their roles from previous Madagascar media, while Henry Winkler, India de Beaufort and Betsy Sodaro joined the cast.

Reception

Critical response
The series has garnered favorable reviews, receiving critical acclaim particularly for its cultural relevance. Additionally, Jacobs and the rest of the cast were praised for their voice acting in the series.

After the initial release of the first five episodes, Robert Lloyd of Los Angeles Times wrote in his review that the series "succeeds on matters of style, script, timing and performance, not the number of individual hairs rendered in a patch of fur. And Julien delivers on all the important accounts."

Accolades

References

External links
 
  at DreamWorks Animation
  at Netflix
 at Netflix
 
 

Madagascar (franchise)
2010s American animated television series
2010s American children's comedy television series
2014 American television series debuts
2017 American television series endings
American children's animated comedy television series
American children's animated adventure television series
American computer-animated television series
American prequel television series
Animated television series about mammals
Netflix children's programming
Animated television shows based on films
Television series by DreamWorks Animation
Television series by Universal Television
Television shows set in Madagascar
English-language Netflix original programming